Kunioniai (Kunionys, formerly) is a village in Kėdainiai district municipality, in Kaunas County, in central Lithuania. According to the 2011 census, the village had a population of 321 people. There are library, agriculture companies, farms. Former Jasnagurka manor is located next to Kunioniai.

History
Kunioniai is known since 1593. It developed alongside the ancient road to Kaunas and probably belonged to the Josvainiai manor. There was a small Jewish community which hosted a tavern, distillated vodka and baked cakes. There was a watermill on the Vikšrupis river and four wooden crosses made by Vincas Svirskis (did not survive till nowadays). The first school was opened in 1929. During the Soviet era Kunioniai was a kolkhoz center. Between 1950 and 1988 it was a Kunioniai selsovet center.

Demography

References

Villages in Kaunas County
Kėdainiai District Municipality